The 1985 Atlantic 10 men's basketball tournament was held in Piscataway, New Jersey at the Rutgers Athletic Center from March 6–9, 1985. Temple defeated Rutgers 59-51 to win their first tournament championship. Granger Hall of Temple was named the Most Outstanding Player of the tournament.

Bracket

External links
  Atlantic 10 Men's Basketball Tournament History 

Atlantic 10 men's basketball tournament
Tournament
Atlantic 10 men's basketball tournament
Atlantic 10 men's basketball tournament